William Alex Hudson (July 9, 1935 – December 13, 2017) was an American football defensive tackle and unheralded member of the original Fearsome Foursome of defensive linemen in pro football. He attended Clemson University, where he was a member of the track and football teams. He played professionally in the Canadian Football League with the Montreal Alouettes and in the American Football League with the San Diego Chargers and the Boston Patriots. He is a member of the South Carolina Sports Hall of Fame. 

Hudson was the younger brother of Bob Hudson, who also attended Clemson and spent 10 seasons (1951-55, 1957-61) in the NFL and AFL as a linebacker and defensive back.

'Fearsome' legacy 
Hudson was drafted by the cash-strapped Chicago Cardinals in the 1957 NFL draft, but he signed for more money with the Alouettes of the Canadian Football League instead. He played with the Alouettes for three seasons and often both ways as an offensive and defensive tackle. Chargers assistant coach Al Davis learned that Hudson was unhappy with his situation and convinced him to jump to the new American League Football League.

Hudson was the captain of the Chargers defense in the 1961 and 1962 seasons, when he teamed with tackle Ernie Ladd and ends Earl Faison and Ron Nery on the most physically dominant line in the AFL if not all of pro football. The group soon became known as the Fearsome Foursome -- they were even celebrated in “The Fearsome Foursome Stomp" musical recording -- although their Los Angeles Rams counterparts in the more established NFL would gain more notoriety with the same monicker only years later. 

“About 10 years ago, (ex-Chargers assistant coach) Chuck Noll made the comment in Sports Illustrated when asked if his Pittsburgh Steelers line (the legendary Steel Curtain) was the best he’d ever had. And he said, no, the Chargers line was the best.” Hudson told the Spartanburg (S.C.) Herald-Journal in a 2009 interview. “We were the largest defensive line in the history of football at that time. And back in those days, we lied about our weight down, where now players lie up about their weight.” 

While the 6-foot-4, 270-pound Hudson was a run-stopper first and foremost, he possessed the savvy and physical strength to be an effective pass-rusher as well. In 1961, his AFL debut, he had four sacks and one interception that was returned for a touchdown. In large part because of the Fearsome Foursome and their unmerciful treatment of quarterbacks, the Chargers intercepted a league record 49 passes en route to the division title. Hudson and Faison were selected to the West Division All-Star team that season.

Hudson was traded to the Patriots after the 1962 campaign. He saw action in four games with them before retirement as a player. He went on to spend 17 years as an area scout for Al Davis after the Chargers assistant coach left the team to become the Oakland Raiders head man. 

Hudson died on December 13, 2017 at a medical center in Spartanburg, South Carolina at the age of 82. He was survived by his wife of 59 years, Lillian, three children, six grandchildren and two brothers.

References

1935 births
2017 deaths
People from Hartsville, South Carolina
Players of American football from South Carolina
American football defensive tackles
Clemson Tigers football players
San Diego Chargers players
Boston Patriots players
American Football League All-Star players
American Football League players